Henry Robins or Robbins may refer to:
Henry Robins (priest) (1882–1960), Dean of Salisbury
Henry Ephraim Robins, President of Colby College, Maine, United States
Henry Robins (MP) (died 1562 or later), Welsh MP for Caernarfon
Henry Asher Robbins (1829–1914), American manufacturer

See also
Harry S. Robins (born 1950), American voice actor and screenwriter